Zal Darreh (also Romanized as Z̄āl Darreh and Zāl Darreh) is a village in Rastupey Rural District, in the Central District of Savadkuh County, Mazandaran Province, Iran. At the 2006 census, its population was 28, in 13 families.

References 

Populated places in Savadkuh County